Antonio Pasqualino was a 15th-century Patrician of Venice. He is best known as an art collector, owning works, by among other, Giorgione and Antonello da Messina.

References

15th-century Venetian people
Italian art collectors